Mathias Eckhoff was a Norwegian businessperson.

Eckhoff moved to Trondheim in 1899, as an associate of Spørch & Co. He bought Kortmans Sodafabrikk in 1908, and expanded the company rapidly. On 6 September 1916, he was elected chairman of the newly created Graakalbanen, that would build a suburban tramway. Eckhoff was a key player in selling sufficient stocks, and purchasing the necessary properly along the line to finance the construction. He died in 1925.

References 

Year of birth missing
1925 deaths
Norwegian businesspeople
Trondheim Tramway people